Jabal Sais ( also known as Qasr Says is a Umayyad desert fortification or former palace in Syria which was built 707-715 AD. The fortification sits near an extinct volcano. Jabal Says is mountain peak next to the fortification which sits 621 meters above sea level.

History
Built from 707-715 AD and located in the Syrian Desert. The location was dependent on the seasonal supply of water which pooled next to the volcano crater. The palace is now just a vestige. The settlement at Jabal Says has existed since 528 AD.

See also

Desert castles
List of castles in Syria

Notes

8th-century fortifications
Umayyad architecture in Syria
Umayyad palaces
Castles in Syria
Palaces in Syria
Buildings and structures in Homs Governorate
8th-century establishments in the Umayyad Caliphate
Buildings and structures completed in 715